The Sun Fast 43 is a French sailboat that was designed by Daniel Andrieu as a blue water  racer-cruiser and first built in 2003. It has also been employed for yacht charter.

Production
The design was built by Jeanneau in France, starting in 2003, but it is now out of production.

Design
The Sun Fast 43 is a recreational keelboat, built predominantly of fiberglass, with wood trim. It has a masthead sloop rig, with a slightly raked stem, a reverse transom with a swimming platform, an internally mounted spade-type rudder controlled by dual wheels and a fixed fin keel. It displaces  and carries  of ballast.

The design has three and four-cabin interior configurations, which provide sleeping accommodation for five to seven people. There is a double "V"-berth in the bow cabin, a smaller single cabin in the starboard bow, a "U"-shaped settee and a straight settee in the main cabin and an aft cabin with a double berth on the port side. The aft cabin may be split to form a fourth cabin. The galley is located on the starboard side just forward of the companionway ladder. The galley is "L"-shaped and is equipped with a stove, an ice box and a double sink. A navigation station is opposite the galley, on the port side. There are two heads, one just aft of the bow cabin on the port side and one on the port side, opposite the galley.

For sailing downwind the design may be equipped with a symmetrical spinnaker.

Operational history
The boat was at one time supported by a class club that organized racing events, the Sun Fast Association.

In a 2004 review for Yacht and  Boat, Barry Tranter wrote, "the boat is quick, fully fitted out, comfortable, and it rates well, so the range of the boats abilities is wide. If performance is one of the requirements on your checklist, the Sun Fast 43 should be able to satisfy most of your other sailing requirements as well."

See also
List of sailing boat types

References

External links

Photo of a Sun Fast 43

Keelboats
2000s sailboat type designs
Sailing yachts
Sailboat type designs by Daniel Andrieu
Sailboat types built by Jeanneau